The women's time trial class C5 road cycling event at the 2020 Summer Paralympics took place on 31 August 2021 at Fuji Speedway, Japan. 9 riders from 8 different nations  competed in this event.

The C5 classification is for cyclists with mild monoplegic spasticity; unilateral arm amputation (above or below elbow), etcetera.

Results
The event took place on 31 August 2021, at 8:18:

References

Women's road time trial C5